Jannis Pieter Mazure (24 December 1899, Rotterdam – 3 November 1990, The Hague) was a Dutch politician.

He was a member of the Labour Party (PvdA) and was considered to be very outspoken about his beliefs. He was president of the Senate from 1966 to 1969. He was preceded by Jan Anne Jonkman and was succeeded by his party colleague Maarten de Niet Gerritzoon.

Decorations
: Commander of the Order of the Netherlands Lion 
: Officer of the Order of Orange-Nassau

References

1899 births
1990 deaths
Presidents of the Senate (Netherlands)
Members of the Senate (Netherlands)
Politicians from Rotterdam
Commanders of the Order of the Netherlands Lion